The 1986 SEC men's basketball tournament took place from March 5–8, 1986 at Rupp Arena in downtown Lexington, Kentucky, home to the University of Kentucky Wildcats men's basketball team. Kentucky won the SEC tournament championship title and the SEC's automatic bid to the 1986 NCAA Men's Division I Basketball tournament by defeating Alabama 83–72.

Coverage of the first round, the quarterfinals and semifinals was produced and regionally syndicated by the Lorimar Sports Network, the sports broadcasting arm of Lorimar-Telepictures. The semifinals of this tournament marks the LSN's final broadcast before going defunct; Jefferson-Pilot Teleproductions would win syndication rights to SEC Basketball before the following season. The championship game in this tournament was nationally televised by NBC, through its sports division, NBC Sports.

Bracket

References

SEC men's basketball tournament
1985–86 Southeastern Conference men's basketball season
1986 in sports in Kentucky
Basketball competitions in Lexington, Kentucky
College basketball tournaments in Kentucky